Pechersk, also spelled Pechyorsk, is the name of three rural localities in Smolensk Oblast, Russia:
Pechersk, Khislavichsky District, Smolensk Oblast, a village in Khislavichsky District, 
Pechersk (selo), Smolensky District, Smolensk Oblast, a selo in Smolensky District, 
Pechersk (village), Smolensky District, Smolensk Oblast, a village in Smolensky District

References